CSI Home Church is one of the largest and oldest churches in Asia. It was built in 1819 under the supervision of Rev. William Tobias Ringeltaube an Prussian, who had come to Nagercoil via Madras and Rev Charles Mead. The land on which the church was built was donated by the then British Travancore Resident, General John Munro, 9th of Teaninich, who had acted as a catalyst between the Missionary and the government of Madras and the Kingdom of Travancore. This helped in the Theological Education for about two Centuries. The church hosted the wedding of linguistic scholar Robert Caldwell in the year 1830. He died 28 August 1891, and was buried in Tirunelveli.

Architecture
This is one of the oldest and biggest of the Protestant churches in South India. The edifice can provide accommodation for nearly 2500 people at a time.

Pastors

Senior Pastor & District Minister :-Rev J.Victor Gnanaraj, 
Presbyter :- Rev. J. Vincent Robert, 
Presbyter :- Rev. P. Raja Jaya Singh

References

Churches in Kanyakumari district
Church of South India church buildings in India